Jiří Polnicky (born 16 December 1989 in Mladá Boleslav) is a Czech former professional cyclist.

Major results

2007
 3rd  Junior race, UCI Cyclo-cross World Championships
2012
 1st Stage 1 (TTT) Czech Cycling Tour
 3rd Road race, National Road Championships
2013
 3rd Tour Bohemia
 9th Overall Czech Cycling Tour
 9th Memoriał Andrzeja Trochanowskiego
2014
 4th Road race, National Road Championships
 6th GP Hungary, Visegrad 4 Bicycle Race
2015
 Visegrad 4 Bicycle Race
2nd GP Czech Republic
9th GP Hungary
 3rd Overall Szlakiem Grodów Piastowskich
 4th Road race, National Road Championships
 5th Puchar Uzdrowisk Karpackich
 9th Rund um Sebnitz
 9th Memoriał Andrzeja Trochanowskiego
 10th Overall Okolo Slovenska
2016
 2nd GP Czech Republic, Visegrad 4 Bicycle Race
 3rd Overall Szlakiem Grodów Piastowskich
1st Stage 3
 9th Overall Bałtyk–Karkonosze Tour
2017
 6th Puchar Ministra Obrony Narodowej
 7th Overall Czech Cycling Tour
1st Stage 1 (TTT)
 7th Poreč Trophy
 10th Overall East Bohemia Tour
 10th Szlakiem Wielkich Jezior
 10th Memoriał Romana Siemińskiego
2018
 3rd GP Adria Mobil
 9th Overall Circuit des Ardennes
 10th Overall Istrian Spring Trophy

References

External links

1989 births
Living people
Czech male cyclists
Sportspeople from Mladá Boleslav